Lova Lova is the fourth studio album from the French power pop group Superbus. It was released on 9 February 2009 on Mercury Records. All tracks were composed by lead singer Jennifer Ayache, with the exception of one, composed by both Ayache and Patrice Focone.

The album will be available in both a standard version as well as a limited CD-book which includes a DVD. A re-issue was sold on 26 October with a new track list, three bonus tracks and a new cover and artwork.

Track list of the first version
 Nelly
 Addictions
 I Wanna Be U
 Hello Hello
 À La Verticale (Vertically)
 Just Like The Old Days
 Gogo Dance Show
 London Town
 Call Girl
 Apprends-Moi (Teach Me)
 Keyhole
 Lova Lova
 Rise (iTunes bonus track)

Track list of the second version

 Addictions
 Keyhole
 Apprends-Moi (Teach Me)
 Just Like The Old Days
 Gogo Dance Show
 London Town
 I Wanna Be U
 Nelly
 Hello Hello
 À La Verticale (Vertically)
 Call Girl
 Lova Lova
 Rise (New Mix)
 Heart Of Glass
 Nelly (Bedroom Version)

Charts

References

Superbus (band) albums
2009 albums
Mercury Records albums
Polydor Records albums